United Nations Security Council Resolution 2585 was passed by a unanimous vote on 9 July 2021, which allowed UN agencies to continue to coordinate and deliver aid cross-border from Turkey to northwestern Syria without Syrian government consent. Russia had threatened to veto renewal of the mandate to allow cross-border aid, but agreed to a compromise the day before the mandate was set to expire on 10 July 2021.

References

External links 
 Text of the Resolution at undocs.org

 2585
 2585
2021 in Syria